Jarosław Jerzy Drozd is a Polish politologist and diplomat. He was serving as the Consul-General of Poland in Saint Petersburg (2007–2011) and Lviv (2011–2015).

Before this he was a professor of politology in Cardinal Stefan Wyszyński University in Warsaw getting his Dr. Sci degree in 1999. His dissertation was devoted to the German-Polish military cooperation in 1989–1997.

References 

Polish diplomats
Living people
Polish political scientists
Year of birth missing (living people)
Consuls-General of Poland
Academic staff of Adam Mickiewicz University in Poznań
Adam Mickiewicz University in Poznań alumni
Academic staff of Cardinal Stefan Wyszyński University in Warsaw